Cambodian cuisine is an umbrella term for the cuisines of all ethnic groups in Cambodia, whereas Khmer cuisine refers specifically to the more than thousand years old culinary tradition of the Khmer people. Over centuries, Cambodian cuisine has incorporated elements of Indian, Chinese and more recently French cuisine, and due to some of these shared influences and mutual interaction, it has many similarities with the neighbouring Thai, Vietnamese and Lao cuisines.

Khmer cuisine can be classified into peasant, elite and royal cuisine, although the difference between the royal and popular cuisine is not as pronounced as in the case of Thailand and Laos. The royal and elite dishes use more varied and higher quality ingredients, and contain more meat, while the peasant food is made from simpler and more accessible ingredients.

History

Because of Cambodia's geographic location, rice and fish, especially freshwater fish, are the two most important sources of nutrients in the Cambodian diet. Rice is a staple food generally eaten at every meal. It is believed to have been cultivated in the territory of Cambodia since 5,000 to 2,000 B.C. The advanced hydraulic engineering developed during the Khmer Empire allowed the Khmer to harvest rice and other crops three to four times a year. According to the International Rice Research Institute, there are approximately 2,000 rice varieties indigenous to Cambodia bred over the centuries by the Cambodian rice farmers. One of them – "Malys Angkor" – has been regarded the world's best rice.

Many spices in Khmer cuisine were introduced by the Indian merchants around the 2nd century. The Indian influence on cuisine among other aspects of Khmer culture was already noted by a Chinese visitor around 400 AD. The trace of Indianization can be seen in the coconut-based curries, as well as boiled red and white sweets. The Chinese began arriving in Khmer Empire in the 13th century, bringing their cuisine with them, from which Cambodian cuisine adopted an extensive use of noodles and stir frying.

From the 9th to the 15th century the culinary influence of the growing Khmer Empire spread beyond the borders of modern-day Cambodia into what is now Thailand, Laos, Vietnam, and Indonesia. The Khmer palace food developed into a refined royal cuisine and through the Khmer royal cooks brought to the Ayutthaya Kingdom strongly influenced the Thai royal cuisine. The original Khmer palace recipes were modified in the Ayutthaya Kingdom, where during the reign of King Narai they also acquired a Portuguese influence and were eventually reintroduced back into Cambodia as the Siamese armies attacked into Cambodia. New Zealand Cambodian chef Kethana Dunnet has even dubbed Cambodian cuisine "the original Thai cuisine".

In the 17th century, the Portuguese and Spanish began introducing various new food crops, such as tomatoes, papaya, pineapple, corn, potato, sweet potato, cassava and chilli from the Americas that were incorporated into local dishes, while the French introduced pâté, salads, wine, coffee, asparagus and baguettes. After the Vietnamese annexation of Cambodia in 1834 and during the period of Vietnamese-controlled People's Republic of Kampuchea from 1979 to 1989 Khmer cuisine was subjected to Vietnamization, adopting dishes such as beef lok lak.

In the decades after World War II, many Cambodian urban middle-class and elite families employed cooks trained to prepare French dishes, and the children of these households often did not learn cooking themselves. The transmission of Cambodian traditional culinary knowledge was even more disrupted by the subsequent war, starvation and refugee crisis in the 1970s and 1980s. In 1975 when the Khmer Rouge gained power the rice production in Cambodia had dropped by 84% in comparison with 1970, and the policies of the Khmer Rouge (such as the ban of private cultivation of food crops, ban of foraging, ban of private ownership of foodstuff, ban of private cooking and ban of private eating combined with the unattainable rice production quotas, forced labour and insufficient food rations) resulted in one of the deadliest famines in modern history, during which from 1975 to 1979 an estimated 500,000 to 1.5 million Cambodians perished (10–20% of the country's population).

Nowadays, more and more Asian fast food chains (such as The Pizza Company, Lotteria, Pepper Lunch, Yoshinoya and Bonchon) and Western fast food chains (such as Burger King, KFC, Krispy Kreme and Carl's Jr.) are entering the Cambodian market, especially in Phnom Penh, and fast food is becoming increasingly integrated into the Cambodian food scene, particularly among the younger generation. In 2004 Malis, the first Cambodian fine dining restaurant in Phnom Penh, was opened. Since the early 2010s there has been an emerging grassroots culinary movement in Siem Reap termed "New Cambodian Cuisine" loosely consisting of six Cambodian chefs and restaurateurs (Pola Siv, Sothea Seng, Pol Kimsan and Sok Kimsan, Mengly Mork and Pheak Tim) experimenting with and modernizing traditional Cambodian dishes. More recently, mobile applications dedicated to Khmer traditional recipes have also been developed, such as "Khmer Cooking Recipe" downloaded more than 100,000 times on Google Play and "Khmer Cooking".

In the United States 

Since the late 1970s, approximately 200,000 Cambodians have settled in the United States of America, nearly half in Southern California, fleeing the Khmer Rouge and the following economic and political turmoil in Cambodia. Cambodian Americans own about 9,000 businesses, predominantly restaurants and grocery stores catering to the local Cambodian American community. Interestingly, Cambodian Americans own around 90% of the 5,000 independently owned doughnut shops in California. The most successful of them was Ted Ngoy who at the peak of his success owned about 70 doughnut shops in California and was nicknamed "The Donut King".

Over time the food cooked by Cambodians in the United States developed into a distinct Cambodian American variety. Meat, especially beef and chicken, plays a much more central role in Cambodian American meals, which also make much more extensive use of tomatoes and corn. The unhealthy eating habits, such as consumption of fatty meat, and obesity rates are higher for the Cambodian Americans who experienced a more severe food deprivation and insecurity in the past. The food of second and third generation Cambodian Americans has become more Americanized. Cambodian cuisine is not well known within the United States and is usually compared to Thai food by many Americans. Most Cambodian restaurants are located in cities with a significant Cambodian population, such as Lowell, Massachusetts, Long Beach, California and Seattle, Washington. Some of the Cambodian-owned restaurants, however, served other Asian cuisines, especially Thai and Chinese, whereas in the ones that served Cambodian cuisine Chinese, Thai and Vietnamese-influenced dishes usually dominated over Khmer dishes.

Long Beach, California has the most Cambodian restaurants in the U.S. – twenty two, including Phnom Penh Noodle Shack and Sophy's. Some Cambodian-owned restaurants in the city, such as Little La Lune Cuisine and Crystal Thai Cambodian, serve Thai food, while others, such as Hak Heang or Golden Chinese Express, serve Chinese food. Lowell, Massachusetts, has at least twenty Cambodian restaurants, among them Tepthida Khmer and Simply Khmer. Other notable Cambodian restaurants include Sok Sab Bai in Portland, as well as Phnom Penh Noodle House and Queen's Deli in Seattle. The most famous Cambodian restaurant in the U.S. is The Elephant Walk serving French-inspired Khmer cuisine. It was opened in 1991 in Cambridge, Massachusetts by Longteine de Monteiro. The restaurant also created a cookbook of the same name, which is the first Cambodian American cookbook.

In 2000 a part of Central Long Beach was officially designated as Cambodia Town, where since 2005 an annual parade and culture festival takes place there that also features Cambodian cuisine. Since the late 2010s there has been an emerging wave of second-generation Cambodian American chefs and restaurants in the U.S. focusing on Cambodian cuisine. Among them is the award-winning restaurant Nyum Bai opened in Fruitvale, Oakland, California in 2018 by chef Nite Yun.

Among other Southeast Asian cuisines
Due to extended culinary contacts and shared extraregional influences from India, China and France, modern Cambodian cuisine has many similarities with the neighbouring Thai, Vietnamese and Lao cuisines. Nowadays, the flavour principles of many Khmer dishes, such as sour fish soups, stews and coconut-based curries, including fish amok, are very similar to Central Thai cuisine, although Khmer dishes contain much less chilli and sugar and make greater use of aromatic herbs and spices. Both Thai and Khmer royal cuisines use special herbal spice pastes for curries, soups, and stews. 

Khmer cuisine has relatively less in common with Northeast Thai and Lao cuisines, however, they all utilize a fish paste in their cooking (called prahok in Khmer, pla ra in Thai and padaek in Lao), which is believed to be a Khmer influence as both Laos and Northeast Thailand historically was part of the Khmer Empire. With Vietnamese and Lao cuisine it shares the French influence as Vietnam, Laos and Cambodia were all part of the French Indochina. Khmer dishes are less salty than Vietnamese food in general, and less sweet, sourer and more citrusy than South Vietnamese food. The ingredients and dishes of Mekong Delta's indigenous Khmer Krom, most notably spices (cardamom, cinnamon, star anise, clove, ginger, turmeric and ground coriander), curries and fermented food (such as mắm and mắm pò hóc). have influenced the cuisine of modern-day Southern Vietnam.

Ingredients

Fermented sauces

In Khmer, a distinction is made between fermented seafood depending on its consistency and the ingredient.  is the general term for seafood fermented with a special technique and usually includes more solid pieces of the fermented ingredient, whereas prahok (ប្រហុក) and kapi (កាពិ) have more homogenous consistency than mam.

 is prepared by adding a mixture of salt, roasted red sticky rice and palm sugar to snakehead fillets and fermenting them for more than a year. The palm sugar and rice give mam an earthier and sweeter flavour and a reddish tone. Prahok, on the other hand, can either be made from small fish with all the bones and less salt (called prahok chhoeung) or large deboned fish and more salt (called prahok sach), which in turn can be made from larger fish (such as the striped snakehead) or smaller fish (such as trei kamplienh), with or without roe. Roe can be removed from the fish, cleaned, drained, and fermented separately. Lastly, kapi is made by pounding cleaned, dried and salted shrimp into a homogenous paste, sun-drying it for one day, pounding the paste again, sun-drying it for two more days and pounding the paste for the final time to attain a viscous consistency.

Prahok is used as flavouring for almost every Khmer dish, mixed with rice or served as a dipping sauce (ទឹកជ្រលក់). It can also be prepared into dishes of its own, such as  prahok k'tis, prahok kap, teuk khreung, teuk prahok prahok ang, and prahok chien. Fermented roe are primarily eaten with steamed eggs, omelettes and other hen or duck egg dishes. Kapi is often mixed with sugar, garlic, lime juice, chilli and crushed peanuts and used as a dipping sauce for vegetables, fruit, meat and fish.

Fish sauce is an important ingredient in Khmer cooking, used to add saltiness to soups and noodle dishes, marinating meats or as a dipping sauce for fish. Oyster sauce was introduced by Chinese immigrants and has become a common ingredient in Cambodian cooking used to add a tangy-sweet flavour to meats and stir-fried vegetables. Oyster sauce, along with fish sauce, and soy sauce, is commonly used together when seasoning foods. Soy sauce is also a common ingredient and condiment, mixed with garlic or aged radish to be eaten with primarily high protein dishes, as well as used to add saltiness when fish sauce is not used. Tamarind sauce is made from tamarind paste mixed with fish sauce, garlic, chilli peppers, lime juice, palm sugar, and vinegar. Hoisin sauce is used to marinate grilled meat and especially for kuyteav or soups with hand pulled noodles.

Herbs and spices

The most common herbs and spices in Cambodian cuisine are sweet basil (ជីរនាងវង), coriander, hot mint, turmeric (រមៀត), garlic, ginger (ខ្ញី), galangal (រំដេង), kaffir lime leaves (ស្លឹកក្រូចសើច), neem leaves (ស្លឹកស្ដៅ), peppermint, lemongrass (ស្លឹកគ្រៃ), chives, scallions, saw leaf herb, fingerroot (ខ្ខ្ជាយ) and rice paddy herb.

Certain regions in Cambodia are known for their spices. Kampot pepper and Kampong Speu palm sugar have been granted Geographical Indications in Cambodia and protected geographical indication in the European Union. Cardamom Mountains in Southwest Cambodia are famous for their large population of wild cardamon plants and Battambang Province for its turmeric.

The cultivation to peppercorns in Cambodia dates back to at least the 13th century and because of its "uniquely strong yet delicate aroma" and "slightly sweet, eucalyptus taste" Kampot pepper is often regarded as the world's best pepper.

Kroeung

Kroeung (– 'ingredients') is a Khmer fresh flavouring paste commonly used in curries, soups and stir-fries, one of the essential ingredients of Cambodian cuisine. The base of the paste consists of pounded lemongrass, galangal, garlic, shallots, kaffir lime leaves and turmeric. There are five common types of kroeung: yellow kroeung (kroeung samlar m’chu), green kroeung (kroeung prâhoeur) and red kroeung (kroeung samlar kari), as well as k’tis kroeung (kroeung samlar k’tis), and saraman kroeung (kroeung samlar saraman) each with different uses.

Vegetables
The Cambodian diet consists heavily of leaf vegetables, such as water morning glory, cabbage, Chinese kale, betel (ស្លឹកម្លូ), vine spinach, and watercress, which are used in soups, stir-fries (ឆា) and salads.

Cambodian cuisine also uses different squashes, such as bitter melon (ម្រះ), winter melon, kabocha, and luffa, root vegetables, such as carrots (ការ៉ុត), cassava, lotus rhizomes, potatoes (ដំឡូង), radish, sweet potatoes and jicama (or ប៉ិកួៈ) and other vegetables, such as cucumbers (ត្រសក់), eggplants (ត្រប់), tomatoes (ប៉េងប៉ោះ), cauliflower, chayote, shallots, yardlong beans and maize (ពោត). Many unripe fruits, such as papaya, green banana, and mango, are also used as vegetables.

Fruits

Fruits in Cambodia are so popular that they have their own royal court. The durian (ទុរេន) is considered the "king", the mangosteen the "queen", sapodilla the "prince" and the milk fruit  the "princess". Other popular fruit include kuy fruit, romduol, pineapple (ម្នាស់), rose apple, jackfruit (ផ្លែខ្នុរ), papaya (ល្ហុង), watermelon (ឪឡឹក), banana (ចេក), mango (ស្វាយ), rambutan (សាវម៉ាវ), guava, longan (មៀន) and tamarind (អម្ពិល).

Although fruits are usually considered desserts, some such as ripe mangoes, watermelon, and pineapples are eaten commonly with heavily salted fish with plain rice. Fruits are also made into smoothies (ទឹកក្រឡុក). Popular fruits for smoothies are durian, mangoes and bananas. Sun-dried limes boiled in sugar and salt water are used in chicken and duck soups, sauces with fish, as well as beverages.

Since 2018, Koh Trong pomelos are recognized as one of the geographical indications in Cambodia. Pomelos grown in the Kratié Province's Koh Trong commune are known for their sweeter taste and the absence of seeds after ripening.

Fish and meat

There are more than 900 different freshwater and saltwater fish species found in Cambodia. Approximately 475,000 tons of fish (ត្រី) are caught in Cambodia every year and a Cambodian annually consumes 63 kg of fish on average. They are fried, dried, smoked and fermented into prahok and fish sauce. Fish and fish products are eaten two to three times a day. Popular fish are snakeheads, snappers, catfishes (ត្រី), and mackerels. Cambodian chef Luu Meng has estimated that approximately 40–50% of Cambodian dishes are made with fish.

It is known that in the late-13th century Khmer Empire cows were not used for riding, meat or hide, and the geese had been recently introduced by the Chinese sailors. Since the 1980s, the role of meat in the Cambodian diet has increased significantly and nowadays the consumption of meat, such as beef, pork and poultry, has become common, especially in the capital region. Beef and chicken is stewed, grilled or stir-fried, while duck meat roasted in char siu style, is popular during festivals.

Other seafood includes an array of shellfish such as crabs (ក្ដាម), clams, cockles (ងាវ), crayfish (បង្កង), shrimp and squid (ត្រីមឹក). Boiled or fried cockles seasoned with salt, chili, and garlic are sold as a popular street food. Giant freshwater prawns are usually only eaten by middle and upper-class Cambodians because of their price. More unusual varieties of meat include frogs (កង្កែប, ; most commonly eaten are East Asian bullfrogs, rice field frogs, balloon frogs, banded bullfrogs, yellow frogs and Asian common toads), turtles (អណ្ដើក) and arthropods (such as tarantulas, fire ants, grasshoppers (កណ្ដូប), giant water bugs and crickets (ចង្រិត)). Crickets, water bugs, and tarantulas are seasoned with salt, sugar and oil, deep-fried and sold as street food.

Noodles

Cambodian noodles are made out of rice, wheat and tapioca flour (banh kanh) in varying thickness. Wheat noodles, such as hand-pulled noodles and the thinner wheat vermicelli, have been adopted from the Chinese cuisine, but incorporated into distinct Cambodian noodle soups and stir-fries. Rice noodles include the indigenous lightly-fermented num banhchok, as well as rice vermicelli, banh sung, silver needle noodles and banh hoi.

Dishes

In Cambodia, street food (ម្ហូបតាមផ្លូវ) is considered a snack rather than a meal. Food stalls are called hang bai (ហាងបាយ) or simply hang in Khmer, which is a borrowing from Chinese háng ("store", "business"). More specifically the stalls are referred to by the main food served, for example, rice noodle stalls or coffee stalls (ហាងកាហ្វេ).

Noodle soups 
 Dumpling noodle soup A Cambodian rendition of the Chinese wonton noodles. The broth is clear topped with garlic chives and the dumplings are filled with seasoned minced pork and shrimp. Variations are often served with wheat vermicelli, a mixture of rice-wheat noodles or flat rice noodles.

 Kuyteav (គុយទាវ) A popular Chinese Cambodian breakfast rice vermicelli soup with meat (chicken, beef or pork) garnished with bean sprouts, chopped scallions, chopped coriander, fish sauce, lime, and sriracha. It can either be served with all the garnish in the soup or the soup on the side. There are many regional variations of kuyteav. In the Phnom Penh version (kuyteav Phnom Penh) pig blood, liver and heart are added, while near Mekong prawns and fish cakes are included. In modern versions of kuyteav pork is sometimes replaced with beef, seafood or chicken. It is similar to Vietnamese hủ tiếu, Malaysian and Singaporean kway teow and Thai kuai tiao (ก๋วยเตี๋ยว).
 Kuyteav khor ko A rice noodle dish created from the stewed/braised beef combined with flat rice noodles. It features French influences including potatoes and carrots topped off with chives and coriander. It is eaten with bread as well. A similar dish exists in Vietnam called hủ tiếu bò kho.

 Num banhchok A popular Cambodian breakfast soup, consisting of lightly fermented rice noodles with a fish gravy made from prahok and yellow kroeung topped off with fresh mint leaves, bean sprouts, green beans, banana flowers, cucumbers and other greens. There is also a red curry version usually reserved for ceremonial occasions and wedding festivities.

 Num banhchok samlar kari A rice noodle dish eaten with a Khmer curry soup. The curry may be yellow (turmeric soup base) or red (chilli curry soup base) depending on the type of soup created and generally include chicken (including legs) or beef, potatoes, onions, and carrots.
 Num banhchok samlar namya A rice noodle dish featuring a Thai sour soup base popular during festivals and family gatherings. It features the same vegetables and herbs in num banhchok teuk prahok although the base is created with Thai green curry paste.
 Num banhchok Kampot A speciality of Kampot featuring a cold rice noodle salad rather than a soup base. It features cuts of spring rolls, a variety of herbs, ground nuts, pork, and fish sauce.
 Num banhchok teuk mrech A speciality soup of Kampot that features a clear fish broth (that does not feature the use of prahok) cooked with chives and vegetables. It is a regional speciality not found in Phnom Penh and other parts of Cambodia where Khmer and Vietnamese varieties of num banhchok are eaten.
 Num banhchok samlar yuon A rice noodle soup originating from the Vietnamese Cambodians living in the urban areas of Cambodia. It is most similar to Vietnamese bún riêu featuring a red blood pork soup base and balls of minced crab meat. It also features more variety of herbs and vegetables not used in Vietnam.

Soups, stews and curries
Samlar refers to soup dishes that are eaten with rice, while the loanword sup refers to dishes that can be eaten without rice, these usually being dishes of Chinese or French origin.

 Caramelized pork and eggs Braised pork and egg stew flavoured in caramelized palm sugar, fish sauce, and Kampot black peppercorns. It may contain tofu or bamboo shoots and often substitutes quail eggs for chicken eggs. A typical Khmer Krom dish.
 Curry soup An Indian-influenced Cambodian soup. It is a traditional wedding and celebration dish, featuring coconut chicken curry gently spiced with paprika, with a soup-like consistency, often cooked with sweet potatoes, and julienned onion. The soup is also used as a dipping sauce for fresh baguettes, while num banhchok samlar kari is often served for breakfast the next day, featuring the same ingredients to make num banhchok but using the samlar kari broth instead of the traditional turmeric and fish-based broth that goes into making num banhchok. 
 Congee A Cambodian dish of Chinese origin. A type of white rice porridge with or without meat (chicken, pork, fish, dried fish, seafood, snails, or frog legs) served with a wide array of condiments (fish floss, pickled vegetables, fried garlic, fish sauce, chilli flakes, chilli oil, and fresh herbs).
 Hot pot (– 'pot fire') The most common form of hot pot in Cambodia contains shared meat and assorted vegetables cooked in a heated pot with a clear broth. There are different hot pot variations with other names and mixed influences from China. It is generally eaten during the colder dry season and during late-night gatherings. Chap chai soup eaten with hand pulled noodles or wheat vermicelli is called chhnang dei, whereas a banquet-style hot pot for dipping beef, shrimp, spinach, dill, napa cabbage, rice noodles and mushrooms is called yao hon. It differs from the standard Cambodian hot pot or other Asian hot pots in that it features a tangy coconut broth rather than a clear broth. Chhnang phnom plerng or volcano hot pot is a Cambodian-style barbecue similar to Lao and Thai counterparts. It is served on a hot pot attached to a grill that allows meat to cook and release juices into the broth, making the soup tastier over time.
 Koh Kong coconut-pineapple curry A Koh Kong speciality dish made out of red kroeung, coconut cream, palm sugar and fish sauce with pieces of pineapple, eggplant, and shallots. Garnished with coriander and basil and eaten with steamed rice.
 Pickled lime soup with chicken (ស្ងោរមាន់ង៉ាំង៉ូវ) A chicken and vegetable soup flavoured with pickled limes or lemons.
 Samlar machu An entire class of samlar, whereby the dominant flavour is an aromatic, citrusy tartness, and there are many different versions. Almost every town or province has its own unique version of samlar machu including samlar machu kroeung (featuring kroeung, turmeric, water morning glory, coriander, stewed beef ribs and tripe), samlar machu Khmer Krom (featuring tomato, pineapple, catfish, lotus rhizome and holy basil) and samlar machu Siem Reap (containing bamboo shoots and tiny freshwater shrimps). The sourness and citrus flavour can come from prahok, tamarind, lemongrass, kaffir lime, lime juice, or herbs such as lemon basil. It is similar to the Vietnamese sour soup canh chua.
 Samlar kako Traditional Cambodian stirring pot soup, one of Cambodia's national dishes. It consists of green kroeung, prahok, roasted ground rice, catfish, pork or chicken, vegetables, fruits and herbs.
 Samlar prahal A fish soup flavoured with prahok and a kroeung made from lemongrass, turmeric, fingerroot and garlic. The primary vegetables included in the stew are kabocha, taro and various mushrooms. Other local vegetables are added according to taste and availability.
 Saraman curry A Cham beef curry. It is similar to Thai Massaman curry and Malaysian Beef rendang.

Stir-fries and rice dishes 
The Khmer term cha refers to the stir-frying technique adopted from the Chinese.

 Bay sach chruk (– 'pork rice') A common breakfast street food featuring rice, char siu barbecue pork, egg (scrambled, steamed, fried, or caramelized), chive soup, chrok (pickled vegetables) or preserved radish, and soy sauce or fish sauce condiments.
 Beef lok lak A beef dish of French Indochinese (specifically Vietnamese) origin. It contains stir-fried marinated cubed beef with fresh red onions, served on a bed of lettuce, cucumbers, and tomatoes and dipped in a sauce of lime juice, sea salt and Kampot black peppercorns. Regional variants include lok lak Americain distinguished by the addition of French fries instead of steamed rice and a fried egg.
 Cantonese noodles A Cantonese Cambodian dish derived from the Cantonese chow fun. It is made by stir-frying flat rice noodles in soy sauce and oyster sauce with eggs, carrots, Chinese kale, and marinated meat (pork, beef, chicken, shrimps or mixed seafood), and sometimes topped off with a tapioca or corn starch gravy. The Cambodian-style Cantonese noodles are related to Thai pad see ew and rat na and Lao lard na.
 Cambodian-style barbecue pork A Cambodian rendition of the Chinese char siu barbecue pork that is often added to baguettes or eaten with rice for breakfast. 
 Cambodian-style roast pork A Cambodian rendition of the Chinese siu yuk roast pork that is usually eaten with white rice, prahok or shrimp paste, and raw vegetables.
 Chha kh'nhei ( – 'stir-fried ginger') A spicy stir fry of meat, usually chicken, eel or frog flavoured with julienned gingerroot, Kampot black peppercorns, garlic, soy and sometimes fresh jalapeños or fresh peppers, for extra heat.
 Chicken rice A Cambodian street food dish similar to Malaysian/Singaporean Hainanese chicken rice with the exception of kreoung being mixed with the rice before steaming.
 Kampot pepper crab A signature seafood dish from the coastal provinces of Kep and Kampot. Crabs are stir-fried with garlic, spring onions, ground Kampot black peppercorns or Kampot green peppercorns, soy sauce and herbs.
 Fried rice A Cambodian version of the Chinese fried rice which includes pork, sausages, eggs, garlic, soy sauce, and herbs. There are numerous variations of the dish in Cambodia, including shrimp fried rice made with shrimps and shrimp paste.
 Grilled eggplant with pork A typical dish from Kampuchea Krom consisting of chargrilled eggplant halves with stir-fried ground pork, garlic, shallots and lemongrass garnished with herbs.
 Kroeung fishcakes Whitefish fillets mixed with kreoung and pounded in a mortar and pestle. The mix is shaped into patties or meatballs and deep-fried. They are eaten with a sauce made out of Kampot black peppercorns mixed with lime juice.
 Kola noodles A vegetarian noodle dish created by the Kola people in the Pailin Province. Boiled rice vermicelli is stir-fried in soy sauce and served with boiled eggs, blanched bean sprouts, grated pickles (papaya, cucumbers and carrots) garnished with roasted peanuts and herbs. Non-vegetarian versions of this dish contain dried shrimp and fish sauce.
 Pak lov (ផាក់ឡូវ) A dish of caramelized/braised organs, both a home dish and popular street food.
 Stir-fried flat rice noodles A Cambodian version of a stir-fried flat rice noodle dish that is a speciality of the southern regions of Cambodia. It often features dark and sweet soy sauce and an assortment of meats. It is topped with sautéed scallions, egg, pork ham, and cuts of spring rolls.
 Stir-fried silver needle noodles A Chinese Cambodian dish. Silver needle noodles stir-fried in fish sauce, soy sauce and palm sugar, with garlic, bean sprouts and scallions or chives, served with a fried egg.
 Stir-fried morning glory Water morning glory stir-fried with garlic, shallots, beef, palm sugar and soy sauce.
 Stir-fried wheat vermicelli Wheat vermicelli stir-fried with garlic, vegetables, mushrooms, and oyster, fish, and soy sauce. The dish is most commonly made for religious festivals such as Pchum Ben, or during temple festivals as a food offering to monks.
 Stir-fried hand-pulled noodles Hand-pulled noodles stir-fried with beef and vegetables, and topped with an egg and gravy. A common street food.

Salads, rolls, and steamed foods 

There are two types of salads – gnoam with cooked meat and p'lear where the meat is either raw or cured in a citrus dressing.

 Banana flower salad A fresh salad consisting of cut banana flowers, shredded poached chicken, crushed roasted peanuts and various herbs and vegetables with a dressing made out of garlic, chillies, fish sauce, lime juice and palm sugar.
 Banh hoi Wheat vermicelli served in a bowl with assorted vegetables, stir-fried ground pork in soy sauce, oyster sauce, and fish sauce, and topped off with fish sauce and sweet coconut milk. Other variations include pork ham and grilled meat. Variations of this dish exist all over Southeast Asia.
 Fish amok A Khmer steamed fish curry (amok) with a mousse-like consistency, one of Cambodia's national dishes. Goby fish, snakehead fish or catfish fillets are rubbed with kroeung mixed with coconut cream or coconut milk and eggs and steamed in a banana leaf container with great morinda leaves at the bottom for 20 to 30 minutes. Served hot and eaten with steamed rice.
 Fresh spring rolls (– 'raw rice paper') A salad spring rolls with assorted vegetables and meats wrapped in edible rice paper.
 Fried spring rolls  (or) A Cambodian version of the Chinese fried spring rolls. Despite originating in the Chinese Cambodian community, nowadays fried spring rolls have spread throughout the country. They are different from Chinese spring rolls with their filling often not being cooked before frying, making Cambodian spring rolls lighter. In addition to that, fish sauce is usually used in the filling, instead of oyster or soy sauce, and Cambodian spring rolls, if not reheated, are fried only once.
 Green papaya salad A salad from garlic, bird's eye chili peppers, dried shrimps, pickled crab, papaya, green beans and tomatoes pounded in a mortar and pestle and mixed with Asian basil, coriander or long coriander and kaffir lime leaves, as well as a savory dressing of lime juice and fish sauce, and garnished with peanuts. Cambodian green papaya salad is less spicy than the Thai variety and less sweet than the Vietnamese green papaya salad.
 Num por pia A dessert in which the wrapper originates from Chinese popiah. Porpear can serve as a wrapper for dessert and for assorted meats; many various dishes exist.
 Pleah sach ko Lime and prahok-cured beef salad, sometimes also including beef tripe, tossed with thinly sliced purple Asian shallots, finely shaved radish, crushed roasted peanuts and fresh herbs such as mint and basil. It is very popular at weddings and for special occasions.
 Rice noodle rolls (– 'cut flat rice noodles') Steamed rice noodle rolls with minced pork filling cut into smaller pieces. It is served with assorted vegetables, cut spring rolls, nuts, fish sauce, and pork ham. It is a speciality in the Phnom Penh and Ta Khmao areas.

Pastries

Most Cambodian pastries use either rice or tapioca flour, whereas in Chinese and French-influenced pastries (such as num pao) wheat flour may also be used.
 Cambodian doughnuts (– 'bracelet cake') Rice flour pastries glazed with palm sugar and garnished with sesame seeds. Sold in markets and usually eaten as a to-go breakfast food.
 Chive cakes A Cambodian street food snack of Chinese origin. It is made from a mixture of glutinous rice flour, tapioca flour, chopped chives and garlic moulded into a flat dumpling shape and fried in oil in a large pan. In Cambodia, the cake is eaten in combination with other dishes to add texture or with sweet fish sauce.
 Coconut-rice crêpes Crêpes made from coconut milk, rice flour and turmeric. Eaten with ground pork, lettuce leaves, carrot-chilli sauce and roasted peanuts.
 Coconut pancakes A street food snack made from a mixture of coconut milk, rice flour and scallions cooked on a cast iron griddle with half-spherical moulds.
 Coconut waffles Waffles made from rice flour and coconut milk originating in the French Indochina period.
 Egg cakes An Asian-styled doughnut originating in China. The dough is deep-fried and flaked with milk.
 Mung bean rice cakes Boiled thin long rolls of glutinous rice dough filled with a mixture of mung beans and coconut milk, topped off with coconut shavings, and white sesame seeds.
 Num pang ( – 'bread') A baguette with braised beef, chicken curry, raw and pickled vegetables as well as pâté, butter, and mayonnaise. It is similar to Vietnamese bánh mì and Lao khao jee pâté.
 Num pao A popular Cambodian street food of Chinese origin, leavened dumplings made from wheat flour, sometimes with the addition of milk and lemon juice, filled with a savoury, spicy or sweet filling. Savoury fillings are usually made from pork and different vegetables.
 Num pia A Chinese Cambodian cake popular during the holidays. It is a speciality in the Siem Reap, Kampot, Phnom Penh, and Ta Khmau areas, and unique given the special red stamp on the top of the cake.
 Num kaov/a'kaov A steamed cupcake made from rice flour combined with palm sugar to create white (coconut), yellow (palm sugar), and pandan (green) variations. This is a popular dessert and street snack as well as being served during traditional weddings.
 Pandan rice cakes A dessert made with pandan, rice flour and tapioca.
 Pandan tapioca balls Sweet tapioca balls flavoured with pandan leaves and salt.
 Palm sugar rice cakes A tapioca dessert in different colours with a palm sugar filling, topped with coconut shavings. It is a traditional dessert featured in weddings alongside husband and wife cake, and pandan desserts. The dessert is humorously nicknamed "husband killer" because of how easy it is to choke on when consumed.
 Pumpkin-coconut custard A dessert made of steamed pumpkin filled with coconut flan. The coconut flan is also often added to puddings.
 Saku (tapioca dessert) A type of steamed dessert made from chestnut flour, coconut milk, and cooked mung beans. 
Sesame balls (– 'orange cake') A fried pastry with a mung bean filling brought to Cambodia by Chinese immigrants. The Khmer name "orange cake" refers to the fruit it resembles.
 Spring onion bread (– 'Chinese bread') A type of bread combining Chinese and French influences. It is flat and baked and fried simultaneously rather than simply being fried like its Chinese counterpart.
 Steamed layer cakes A steamed rice cake made out of layers of pandan and coconut milk. It is often featured in the Cambodian wedding banquet. Similar to Vietnamese bánh da lợn, Thai khanom chan and Indonesian kue lapis.
 Sticky rice in bamboo A cake made by roasting a mixture glutinous rice, black-eyed peas or beans, coconut milk, grated coconut and palm sugar in bamboo tube over a fire for around 90 minutes. Kralan is often prepared and eaten at Chinese and Khmer New Year.

Sticky rice dishes and dumplings 

Bai ben A sticky rice dessert that is moulded into a ball and topped with sesame seeds. It is very popular during Pchum Ben.
Durian sticky rice A sticky rice dessert topped with sweet coconut milk and slices of durian fruit. A variation of that is mango sticky rice.
 Mung bean dumplings Steamed glutinous rice or sago dumplings with mung bean filling served in a ginger and coconut sauce. Similar to Chinese tong sui.
 Sticky rice with sesame seeds A slightly hardened glutinous rice and coconut dessert topped off with roasted sesame seeds.
Siev mai A Cambodian rendition of a Chinese pork dumplings. In Khmer, "siev mai" refers not only to the dumpling but also a style of meatballs created by the southern Chinese immigrants in Phnom Penh.

Steamed sticky rice cakes Glutinous rice flour pastries steamed in banana leaves with different sweet or savoury fillings. The pyramid-shaped num chang are filled with pork, sausage, and beans and are derived from Chinese zongzi, the pyramid-shaped num bot are filled with mung bean paste and the pyramid-shaped num kom are filled with a mixture of coconut shavings, toasted sesame seeds and palm sugar. The cylinder-shaped num ansom can either be filled with sugar bananas or jackfruits, or pork. In addition to steaming num ansom can also be fried or grilled depending on the occasion. The cylinder shape represents a phallus, symbolizing Shiva, the masculine principle of God, while the pyramid shape symbolizes the Shakti, the feminine principle of God. Sticky rice cakes are given as offerings to the manes of the ancestors on Pchum Ben to gain their blessing to the rice fields.
Tapioca pearl balls Tapioca balls with a meat filling. Minced meat is seasoned and cooked then wrapped in a tapioca mixture and steamed. The dish is often served with vegetables and sweet sauce. It is similar to Thai sakhu sai mu, Lao khao nom sakoo and Vietnamese bánh ít trần.

Puddings, sweet porridges and jellies

Cambodian desserts include puddings, sweet porridges and agar jellies.
 Banana coconut tapioca pudding A Khmer porridge made out of sago or tapioca pearls, slices of banana, coconut milk and palm sugar and garnished with grated coconut and toasted white sesame seeds.
Grass jelly Often eaten with soybean milk during a hot day because of its cooling properties.
 Green bean porridge One of the most popular desserts in Cambodia made from tapioca, mung beans, sugar, and coconut milk and usually eaten after lunch or after work in the evening.
 Longan pudding A pudding made out of coconut milk, palm sugar and tapioca topped with fresh longan.
 Lotus seed and longan porridge A watery sugar-based dessert that can be served cold or warm. It features longan and lotus seeds and can also be served as a drink.
 Mung bean pudding A dessert of Chinese origin that is very popular in the Chinese diaspora across Southeast Asian countries. It is made of split mung beans, palm sugar, flour and coconut milk. Chinese Cambodians prefer this bean pudding with fried breadsticks.
Num lot A green or white dessert made from rice flour in a liquid of coconut, milk, water and sugar. A similar dish is Indonesian cendol.
 Pandan coconut jelly A dessert with layers of pandan and coconut agar jelly.
 Red lotus seed jelly A coconut milk-based dessert that is very popular during hot weather. The small reddish/pinkish jewels are water chestnuts covered with tapioca, served with sweetened coconut milk and shaved ice. Shredded jackfruit and jellied coconut flesh can also be added to this dessert. Jellied coconut flesh occurs when the coconut lacks an enzyme that turns its flesh into normal coconut flesh. The flesh continues to develop in the jelly state. In Khmer, tur tim means either "ruby" or "pomegranate". Similar to Thai thapthim krop.
 Sweet corn porridge Sweet corn kernels and glutinous rice boiled in coconut milk sweetened with palm sugar.

Beverages 

Water is the most popular drink. As drinking water sources are not always easily accessible in rural areas water is boiled at home and consumed hot. In urban areas bottled water, as well as soda and sweetened fruit beverages, is available. Green tea (តែបៃតង) is consumed throughout the day. It is believed to have been introduced in the Khmer Empire by the Chinese, but despite the growing consumption and suitable climate nowadays most green tea is imported and very little is actually grown locally. Camellia sinensis cambodiensis, a local strain of the tea plant, grows in the Kirirom National Park, in the remnants of a former 300-hectare tea plantation established in the 1960s by the King Norodom Sihanouk, and the area around Chamkar Te village in Mondulkiri Province. Recently, there have been efforts to revive the Cambodian tea production. Lemon iced tea is also prepared and consumed.

In urban areas coffee is also popular and is usually served with sweetened condensed milk rather than black. Coffee can be consumed either iced (កាហ្វេទឹកកក) or hot. It is sold in coffee carts, coffeehouse chains and specialty coffee shops. More than 90% of all coffee in Cambodia is imported from other countries, such as Vietnam, Laos, and Thailand.

Smoothies are an important part of an evening's consumption available at juice stalls in towns all over the country from the late afternoon. They can contain a mixture of fruits or just one or two; coconut milk, sugar syrup, condensed milk and shaved ice are also added, as is a raw egg (unless specified otherwise – ot yoh pong mowan). Soy milk is sold in the morning by street vendors; the green version is sweetened and thicker than the unsweetened white. Served either hot or cold, sweetened or unsweetened. Sugarcane juice (ទឹកអំពៅ) is also a popular street drink made by pressing the juice out of sugarcane stalks with a special machine. Served with ice and sometimes flavoured with citrus to balance the sweetness. Pandan juice is made from the extract of pandan leaves and usually sold in Cambodian food stalls.

Fermented beverages 

According to the Chinese diplomat Zhou Daguan, five fermented alcoholic beverages were produced in the late-13th century Khmer Empire: mead, pengyasi made from the leaves of an unidentified plant, baolengjiao made from rice hulls and rice leftovers, "sugar-shine wine" made from sugar and palm starch wine made from the starch of the leaves of a palm growing on the riverbank.

Nowadays, the most popular alcoholic beverage is beer (ប៊ីយេរ). The first domestically brewed beer was produced in the 1930s during the French Indochina period by the Brasseries & Glacières de L'Indochine company in Phnom Penh. In 1995 the annual beer consumption per capita was only around two liters, but by 2004 it began to rise significantly and in 2010 beer overtook spirits as the most popular alcoholic beverage in Cambodia. Currently, the four biggest beer producers in Cambodia are the Cambrew Brewery, Cambodia Brewery, Khmer Brewery and Kingdom Breweries. Recently, there has also been a quickly growing craft beer scene with 12 brewpubs or microbreweries operating in Cambodia in 2019.

A popular traditional alcoholic beverage is rice wine (ស្រាស). It is produced by fermenting boiled and dried rice with a natural fermentation starter (dom bai) for at least 24 hours and distilling the resulting mixture. Modern distillation methods were introduced during the French Indochina period. Occasionally, there have been instances of methanol poisoning from low quality home-made rice wine. Rice wine can also be infused with various herbs, roots, bark and insects to create medicinal rice wines (srah tinum). A popular drink infused with deer antlers and different herbs is the Special Muscle Wine manufactured since 1968 by Lao Hang Heng Wine. The company also produces popular Golden Muscle Liquor and Wrestler Red Wine, whereas Sombai manufactures a line of premium infused rice wines.

Another popular, albeit lower-prestige alcoholic beverage is palm wine (ទឹកត្នោតជូរ). It might have become popular during the French Indochina period as a cheap alternative to other wines. Palm wine is produced by fermenting Asian palmyra palm sap either through spontaneous fermentation by adding several plants to the sap and hanging the containers on trees or through the addition of a fermentation starter (ម៉ែទឹកត្នោតជូរ) made from fermented palm sap and various dried plant xylems and bark. Confirel in Pou Senchey District uses the Champagne method to produce sparkling palm wine under the name "Thnot Sparkling Mekong Wine".

A regional beverage of the Mondulkiri province is yellow and purple passion fruit wine, while wine from jambolan is produced by a company in Takéo province. Samai Distillery, Cambodia's first rum distillery, produces rum and even uses Kampot peppercorns in one of its products. Cambodia's first and only winery Chan Thai Choeung In Battambang has been commercially producing grape wine since 2005.

Meals and eating etiquette 

In Cambodia, meals are usually freshly prepared three times a day (for breakfast, lunch and dinner), although in rural areas only breakfast and dinner may be eaten. Due to a general lack of refrigeration, leftovers are usually discarded. A typical Cambodian breakfast consists of rice porridge with dried salted fish, rice with dried salted fish and vegetables, baguette with condensed milk or rice/egg noodles with meat and leaf vegetables. For lunch and dinner, Cambodians usually eat steamed rice, soup with meat (fish, pork, chicken or beef) and leaf vegetables, fried fish or other meat and fruit.

In Cambodian meals just like the rest of Southeast Asia, all dishes are served and eaten simultaneously, as opposed to the European course-based meal format or the Chinese meal with overlapping courses. The only exception is if the meal contains French-style dishes, in which case the dishes are served in courses. A number of side dishes are usually served alongside the main dishes. In addition to that, a variety of condiments, such as chili jam, pickled green chillies, sugar, garlic flakes, fish sauce and soy sauce, are also available. While steamed rice and soups are usually served hot, side dishes may be served at room temperature. The balance of flavours and satisfaction of individual preferences are achieved by combining the individual dishes and rice. For example, a Cambodian meal may consist of a sour soup, a salty fish, fried vegetables and plain rice, which is different from Thai food where sourness, saltiness, sweetness and spiciness are usually contained within a single dish.

Khmer food is traditionally eaten with hands, but nowadays spoons, forks and chopsticks are also used. Knives are rarely used as the majority of Cambodian food is already cut into bite-sized pieces. Forks and spoons were introduced by the French and are used for eating rice and/or soup-based dishes, whereas chopsticks were introduced by the Chinese and are used only for eating noodle dishes.

International popularity 

Cambodian cuisine is not very known across the world. Food Republic has described Cambodian as "The Greatly Underappreciated Outlier In Asian Cooking". Fodor's Travel has called Cambodian cuisine "the most underrated in Southeast Asia" and Siem Reap "SE Asia’s Most Underrated Food Destination", while the magazine Time Out has named Kep one of "18 of the world’s most underrated food cities"

Outside of Cambodia, Cambodian cuisine can generally be found in countries with sizeable Cambodian immigrant communities, such as the United States, France, Australia and Canada, especially in the Little Cambodia ethnic enclaves, but it is often aimed towards the local Cambodian community. Due to commercial considerations and the ethnic composition of the Cambodian diaspora many Cambodian-owned restaurants have chosen to serve the better-known Thai, Chinese and Vietnamese food instead.

Culinary diplomacy 

In December 2020, the Ministry of Foreign Affairs and International Cooperation launched an official "Food Diplomacy 2021–2023" campaign as part of a larger economic diplomacy strategy. At the launch Minister of Foreign Affairs and International Cooperation Prak Sokhonn listed prahok, fish amok, pomelo salad, samlar kako, coconut-pineapple curry (samlar k'tis), coconut prahok dip and num banhchok as some of the Khmer dishes to be promoted in the campaign. The ministry also established a program to train Cambodian cooks for serving in Cambodian embassies and a program for providing ambassador spouses with knowledge about the Khmer cuisine.

In February 2021, the ministry published a cookbook "The Taste of Angkor" as a culinary promotion tool for Cambodian diplomatic missions abroad. A 1960 Cambodian cookbook and culinary guide "The Culinary Art of Cambodia" by Princess Norodom Rasmi Sobbhana republished in May 2021 by Angkor Database was also included in the campaign. In June 2021, a series of promotional videos under the slogan "Taste Cambodia" featuring Khmer foods and culinary activities in different Cambodian regions commissioned by the Ministry of Tourism of Cambodia were released. In May 2022, culinary training and representation facilities under the name of "Angkor Kitchen" were unveiled at the Ministry of Foreign Affairs and International Cooperation.

Awards

Cookbooks 
The cookbook "From Spiders to Water Lilies, Creative Cambodian Cooking with Friends" published by non-governmental organization Friends-International has received the 2009 Gourmand World Cookbook Award as the "Best Asian Cuisine Cookbook", becoming the first book from Cambodia to win the award.

The French-language Khmer cookbook Au Pays de la Pomme Cythère, de Mère en Fille, Authentiques Recettes Khmères written and self-published by Kanika Linden and her mother Sorey Long has won the 2010 Gourmand Awards as the world's "Best Asian Cuisine Cookbook". The English-language version of the book "Ambarella, Cambodian Cuisine" has won the 2013 Gourmand Awards as the "Best Asian Cuisine Cookbook" in the UK and world's "Best Asian Cuisine Cookbook" in 2014.

The cookbook "The Taste of Angkor" published by the Ministry of Foreign Affairs and International Cooperation of Cambodia has won the 2021 Gourmand World Cookbook Award as the "Best Asian Cookbook" and 2022 Gourmand World Cookbook Awards as the "Best Asian Cuisine Book" and "Heads of State/Food" for the book's foreword written by Deputy Prime Minister Prak Sokhon.

The republished Cambodian cookbook and culinary guide "The Culinary Art of Cambodia" has received the "Special Award of the Jury" at the 2022 Gourmand World Cookbook Awards.

Restaurants 
Joannès Rivière's Cuisine Wat Damnak has been included in position No. 50 of Asia's 50 Best Restaurants in 2015, becoming the first Cambodian restaurant to make the list. In the 2016 list it rose to the 43rd position. In 2020, the restaurant Embassy spearheaded by the Kimsan Twins was included in the Asia's 50 Best Restaurants newly created 50 Best Discovery list.

Chefs 
Cambodian chef Luu Meng has received Asia's Top Chef award from the Malaysia-based business and lifestyle magazines "Top 10 of Malaysia" and "Top 10 of Asia" in 2014.

Cambodian chefs from the Cambodia Chefs' Association have won the 2019 ASEAN Gourmet Challenge with three gold medals, as well as received six silver and 17 bronze medals in the Global Pastry Chefs Challenge and Global Young Chefs Challenge categories at the Thailand Ultimate Chef Challenge taking place from 28 May to 1 June in Bangkok.

See also 
 Kula cuisine
 Cham cuisine

References

Bibliography

Further reading

External links

 Cambodia's Forgotten Food. 11 November 2018. The Food Programme. BBC Sounds
 Dunston, Lara (16 August 2017). Cambodian Food – Cooking with Fire, Foraging, Fermentation and Flowers. Grantourismo Travels.
 Dunston, Lara (20 August 2016). Dispelling Cambodian Cuisine Myths — It's Not 'Mild Thai'! Grantourismo Travels.
 Lees, Phil (18 August 2006). Why travelers dislike Khmer food. Phnomenon.
 Exploring Cambodian Food in Long Beach, CA with Phnom Penh Noodle Shack and Allen Prom. 21 January 2021. Eating America with India
 What A Royal Birthday Cake Looks Like. 30 August 2020. Cooking For The Crown. Real Royalty with Foxy Games
 Khmer Krom recipes 
 Taste Cambodia. 18 July 2021. Visit Cambodia - Kingdom of Wonder. via YouTube.

 
Southeast Asian cuisine